Janez Lenarčič (born 6 November 1967) is a Slovenian diplomat who has been serving as European Commissioner for Crisis Management in the Von der Leyen Commission since 2019. He is a former Director of the Office for Democratic Institutions and Human Rights within the Organization for Security and Co-operation in Europe.

Early life and education

Lenarčič holds a degree in international law from the University of Ljubljana, 1992.

Career in diplomacy
Lenarčič entered the Slovenian foreign service in 1992 . His first posting in 1994-1999 was at the Mission of Slovenia to the United Nations in New York.
From 2000 to 2001 Lenarčič worked as adviser to the foreign minister and Prime Minister Janez Drnovšek. From 2002 to 2003 he served as secretary of state in the office of the prime minister.
Lenarčič was ambassador of Slovenia to the Organization for Security and Co-operation in Europe (OSCE) in Vienna from 2003 to 2006, and chaired the OSCE Permanent Council in 2005 during the Slovenian chairmanship.
From 2006 to 2008 Lenarčič was secretary of state for European affairs, including representing Slovenia during the Lisbon Treaty negotiations in 2007 and later representing the Slovenian EU Council Presidency to the European Parliament in 2008.

Lenarčič then moved to Warsaw as Director of the OSCE's Office for Democratic Institutions and Human Rights (ODIHR) until 2014.

In 2014 Lenarčič was named secretary of state in the cabinet of the Slovenian Prime Minister Miro Cerar. In 2016 he moved to Brussels as Permanent Representative of Slovenia to the EU.

Member of the European Commission, 2019–present
In 2019 Lenarčič was nominated by Prime Minister Marjan Šarec (Renew Europe) for the post of Slovenia's European Commissioner in the Commission led by Ursula von der Leyen.

In early March 2020, Lenarčič was appointed by von der Leyen to serve on the Commission's special task force to coordinate the European Union's response to the COVID-19 pandemic.

Awards
Lenarčič received France's highest award, the Légion d'honneur.

References

External links 

 CV at the Slovenian Government's website
 Janez Lenarčič takes up job as new ODIHR director

1967 births
Government ministers of Slovenia
Living people
OSCE ODIHR directors
Diplomats from Ljubljana
Permanent Representatives of Slovenia to the United Nations
Slovenian European Commissioners
University of Ljubljana alumni
European Commissioners 2019–2024